Edgar Viies (12 January 1931, Simititsa, Leningrad Oblast – 20 September 2006) was an Estonian sculptor.

Edgar was born in Leningrad Oblast Volosovo to a farming family. From 1951-52 he studied at the Estonian State Art Institute and then of Leningrad Academy of Arts, graduating in 1958. 
He acted as a freelance artist throughout his life.

In 1974 he was awarded the Kristjan Raud Art Award. In 2002 he was given the Estonian Cultural Endowment annual award.

References
 Juta Kivimäe, Kunstimuuseum lennujaamas. Edgar Viies (1931-2006), sõjajärgse modernismi klassik, näituse kaastekst, Eesti Kunstimuuseum, 2012

External links
ArtNet entry

1931 births
2006 deaths
20th-century Estonian sculptors
20th-century Estonian male artists
Estonian Academy of Arts alumni
Burials at Metsakalmistu